"The Grain" or "A Grain As Big As A Hen's Egg" (Russian: Зерно с куриное яйцо) is an 1886 short story by Leo Tolstoy about a king seeking to understand the properties of a grain he acquires.

Summary

One day a boy named Anas found a strange object in a ravine, and they sold it to a passerby for a penny, who then sold it to a curiosity shop.  Eventually the object found its way to the king, and the king was very curious to know what it was.  He called together his wise men, and they discovered that the object, about the size of a hen's egg, was actually a large grain.

The king wanted to know where such a large grain could come from, and he had his men bring him an old peasant, hoping that he might know something of it.  An old decrepit peasant, nearly blind and unable to walk, was brought before the king.  The king showed him the grain, and the peasant said that he had never seen anything like it before, but maybe his father would know something.  The peasant's father was found and brought before the king.  The father was apparently healthier than the son, with only one bad leg and better eyes.  He, however, still could not identify the grain, but suggested that his father might know something about it.  That peasant's father was found, and he was a healthy man with good legs and bright eyes.  He identified the grain as one that he and his family had planted in abundance in their time.

Covet 
 Translated into Telugu as "Kodi Guddhantha Godhuma Ginja" by Mahidhara Jaganmohana Rao.

See also

Bibliography of Leo Tolstoy
Twenty-Three Tales

References
"The Works of Tolstoy."  Black's Readers Service Company: Roslyn, New York.  1928.

External links

 Complete Text Online, as translated by Louise Maude and Aylmer Maude
 "A Grain as Big as a Hen's Egg", from RevoltLib.com
 "A Grain as Big as a Hen's Egg", from Marxists.org
 Other Online Versions
The Grain at the Online Literature Network

1886 short stories
Short stories by Leo Tolstoy
Parables